Paulina "Poulli" Chiziane (born 4 June 1955, Manjacaze, southern province of Gaza, Mozambique) is an author of novels and short stories in the Portuguese language. She was awarded the 2021 Camões Prize for literature, awarded to writers from Portuguese-speaking countries.

Early life
She studied at Eduardo Mondlane University, Maputo. She was born to a Protestant family that moved from Gaza to the capital Maputo (then Lourenço Marques) during the writer's early childhood. At home she spoke Chopi and Ronga.

Writing
Chiziane was the first woman in Mozambique to publish a novel. Her writing has generated some polemical discussions about social issues, such as the practice of polygamy in the country. For example, her first novel, Balada do Amor ao Vento (1990), discusses polygamy in southern Mozambique during the colonial period. Related to her active involvement in the politics of Frelimo (Liberation Front of Mozambique), her narrative often reflects the social uneasiness of a country ravaged and divided by the war of liberation and the civil conflicts that followed independence. Her novel Niketche: Uma História de Poligamia (translated into English as The First Wife: A Tale of Polygamy) won the José Craveirinha Prize in 2003.

Interpretation 

Chiziane's writing has often been defined as political and feminist. Writing for this author is a mission. It is a way to express the difficulties that women encounter when faced with the heterogeneity of Mozambican cultural traditions and the newly developed legal and administrative systems. Chiziane's writing addresses regional differences in cultural and political aspects of gender relations. In her novel Niketche, for instance, she depicts the Mozambican South as dominated by a patriarchal culture, whereas the North is shaped by traditions of matriarchal rule. She also alludes to the fact that Frelimo itself assumed an ambiguous attitude with regard to polygamy, making it illegal at first, but then tolerating its continuing practice. Throughout her work, Chiziane's attention has focused on broad social issues related to women's rights and concerns, such as monogamy and polygamy, but also on subjective and intimate relationships between individual men and women. Chiziane has stated that, in accordance with the tradition of her land, she considers herself a storyteller rather than a novelist.

In 2016, she announced that she was retiring from writing.

Novels
 Balada de Amor ao Vento (1990), 
 Ventos do Apocalipse (1996), 
 O Setimo Juramento (2000), 
 Niketche: Uma História de Poligamia (2002) - Companhia das Letras, 
 O Alegre Canto da Perdiz (2008) - Caminho, .
As andorinhas (2009)  ISBN 978-856-11-9197-9
Eu, mulher: por uma nova visão do mundo (2013), ISBN 8561191902
Ngoma Yethu: o curandeiro e o Novo Testamento (2015), ISBN 858358043X
O canto dos escravizados (2017), ISBN 8583580367

Awards and honours
On 20 October 2021, it was announced that Chiziane had been awarded the 2021 Premio Camões (Camões Prize). This is given to writers from Lusophone countries for the entire body of their work.
On  28 November 2022, Paulina was awarded the Academic degree of Doctor Honoris Causa by Universidade Pedagógica

References

1955 births
Living people
People from Gaza Province
Mozambican women writers
Women novelists
Mozambican novelists
Mozambican women short story writers
20th-century women writers
20th-century novelists
20th-century short story writers
21st-century women writers
21st-century novelists
21st-century short story writers
Camões Prize winners